Sexmob (also styled Sex Mob) is an American jazz band based in New York City that formed as a Knitting Factory vehicle for Steven Bernstein to exercise his slide trumpet. Sexmob's sets feature a high proportion of covers, usually familiar pop songs, which are given a humorous but avant-garde treatment. Bernstein points out that this is a return to a fundamental jazz tradition to take a familiar song and then disassemble and reassemble it.

Discography
 Din of Inequity (Knitting Factory, 1998)
 Solid Sender (Knitting Factory, 2000)
 Theatre & Dance (2000)
 Sex Mob Does Bond (Ropeadope, 2001)
 Dime Grind Palace (Ropeadope, 2003)
 Sexotica (Thirsty Ear, 2006)
 Sexmob meets Medeski Live in Willisau 2006 (Thirsty Ear, 2009)
 Sexmob Plays Fellini: Cinema, Circus & Spaghetti, the Music of Nino Rota (2013)
 Cultural Capital (2017)

References

External links
Steven Bernstein's Sexmob page

Avant-garde jazz ensembles
Thirsty Ear Recordings artists
Ropeadope Records artists
Knitting Factory Records artists
American jazz ensembles from New York City